Greece competed at the 2015 UCI Track Cycling World Championships in Saint-Quentin-en-Yvelines at the Vélodrome de Saint-Quentin-en-Yvelines from 18–22 February 2015. A team of 2 cyclists (0 women, 2 men) was announced to represent the country in the event.

Results

Men

Sources

References

Nations at the UCI Track Cycling World Championships
Greece at cycling events